Marcus Thorén (born 14 April 1971) is a Swedish taekwondo practitioner. He competed in the men's +80 kg event at the 2000 Summer Olympics.

References

External links
 

1971 births
Living people
Swedish male taekwondo practitioners
Olympic taekwondo practitioners of Sweden
Taekwondo practitioners at the 2000 Summer Olympics
Sportspeople from Stockholm